The Cape Government Railways 3rd Class 4-4-0 were a series of South African steam locomotive classes from the pre-Union era in the Cape of Good Hope. Several types were built, identified by their building year:
 CGR 3rd Class 4-4-0 1883
 CGR 3rd Class 4-4-0 1884
 CGR 3rd Class 4-4-0 1889
 CGR 3rd Class 4-4-0 1898
 CGR 3rd Class 4-4-0 1901
 CGR 3rd Class 4-4-0 1903

0260
4-4-0 locomotives
Cape gauge railway locomotives